The 2005 J.League Division 2 season was the 34th season of the second-tier club football in Japan and the 7th season since the establishment of J2 League.

In this season, two additional clubs joined from the third-tier Japan Football League, though the number of participating clubs stayed at twelve, as no teams were relegated from 2004 J1 League to replace the two promoted clubs. The clubs competed in the quadruple round-robin format for the top two promotion slots. The third placed-finisher participated in the Pro/Rele Series for the promotion. There was no relegation to the third-tier Japan Football League.

General

Promotion and relegation 
To be completed

Changes in competition formats 
To be completed

Changes in clubs 
To be completed

Clubs 

The following twelve clubs played in J.League Division 2 during the 2005 season. Thespa Kusatsu and Tokushima Vortis newly joined the J.League Division 2 from Japan Football League. Due to expansion of J.League Division 1, there was no relegated club from 2004 J1 League. Since Tokushima is based in Shikoku, it became the first season for J.League being presented on all four major islands of Japan, Hokkaidō, Honshū, Kyūshū, and Shikoku.

 Consadole Sapporo
 Vegalta Sendai
 Montedio Yamagata
 Mito HollyHocks
 Thespa Kusatsu 
 Yokohama FC
 Shonan Bellmare
 Ventforet Kofu
 Kyoto Purple Sanga
 Tokushima Vortis 
 Avispa Fukuoka
 Sagan Tosu

League format 
Twelve clubs play in a quadruple round-robin format, a total of 44 games each. A club receives 3 points for a win, 1 point for a tie, and 0 points for a loss. The clubs are ranked by points, and tie breakers are, in the following order:
 Goal differential
 Goals scored
 Head-to-head results
A draw would be conducted, if necessary. However, if two clubs are tied at the first place, both clubs will be declared as the champions. The top two clubs will be promoted to J1, while the 3rd placed club plays a two-legged Promotion/relegation series.
Changes from Previous Year
None

Final league table

Final results

Top scorers

Attendance figures

References

See also 

J2 League seasons
2
Japan
Japan